No licensed radio stations broadcast on AM frequency 180 kHz any longer. Turkish broadcaster TRT is reported to have used the frequency in the past. In the United States, this frequency falls within the 160-190 kHz LowFER band allowed by Part 15 of the Federal Communications Commission, and hobby stations are permitted to use this frequency.

The audio frequency 180 kHz has been used to track fish.

Song
"A.M. 180" is the name of a song composed by Jason Lytle and performed by  Grandaddy, an American indie rock band from Modesto, California, and subsequently by PUP, a band based in Toronto.

References

Lists of radio stations by frequency